Robert Luciano (born 1974) is an Australian fund manager, best known as the co-founder of VGI Partners. Luciano's wealth in 2019 would have qualified him for the Financial Review Rich List.

Business career 
At Prudential-Bache, Luciano broke into funds management after recommending that clients buy shares in the Australian Securities Exchange when it converted from a co-operative to a listed company. The contrarian recommendation gained the notice of Mark Nelson at Caledonia Investments, who subsequently hired Luciano.

Luciano repeated the trick at Caledonia by buying into the Chicago Mercantile Exchange after it shifted from a co-operative to a listed company, which became one of Caledonia’s best investments.

Luciano co-founded VGI Partners in 2008. VGI was best known for its short positions against Slater & Gordon, jeweller Pandora, Hanesbrands, and Corporate Travel Management. VGI's aggressive short case against Slater & Gordon was an enormous success, which pushed the law firm's share price from A$8 to less than 30c.

Luciano, who describes himself as being not good with people, has a combative and direct management style. Luciano has several paranoid idiosyncrasies, including travelling with elite soldiers as bodyguards, installing a panic room in his office, and installing an airport-style swipe gate inside the door of VGI’s premises. Luciano also ensures the Wi-Fi is turned off on the entire floor of any hotel room in which he stays.

VGI Partners lost two-thirds of its investment team through the pandemic. According to one former employee, Luciano's team abandoned him because he can be difficult to work alongside.

VGI's staff exodus included Douglas Tynan, a long-time lieutenant to Luciano, who resigned in 2020, and has since unveiled GCQ Funds Management. GCQ has opened up to client money in 2022, and has already lured a handful of VGI staff. Tynan was credited with picking long-term winners like Mastercard, WD-40, and Kikkoman at VGI, and building relationships with some of the country’s sophisticated family offices and high-net-worth investors.

Other senior departures include Robert Poiner, who joined VGI Partners in 2009 shortly after its launch, and became one of its top portfolio managers. Poiner left VGI in late-2021, and has since been raising money for his own firm, Edgeworth Capital.

In November 2022, VGI's Chief Operating Officer Adam Philippe severed ties with the firm for a position with Roc Partners.

In 2021, VGI's listed investment companies, VGI Partners Global Investments (VG1) and VGI Partners Asian Investments (VG8), came under pressure from activist investors for poor performance, and the mismatch between the share price and the value of the assets in its listed portfolios. The activists suggested Luciano lacked appeal for retail investors, and that VG1’s fees were too high. Luciano has also attracted negative press attention for his 2021 decision to prioritise the long-term risk of deflation over more immediate worries regarding inflation.  

Since inception in September 2017, VG1 has generated a net return of +0.3% per annum to November 2022, which compares to its previously stated investment objective to deliver average compound annual returns of +10% to +15% (after all fees and expenses) over a period of more than five years.

VGI's recent foray into private investing has also been unsuccessful, after it wrote down a US$5m investment in Nicholas Moore-chaired Willow Technology Corporation by 69 per cent in 2022.

In 2022, VGI merged with Regal Funds Management to become Regal Partners. Regal Chief Investment Officer Philip King said the merger would allow Luciano focus on investing, without the distraction of day-to-day operational matters.

While the merger was described as a ‘shotgun marriage’, Luciano said Regal Partners would benefit from the experience that both he and King brought. In January 2022, Luciano said, "Certainly since I started VGI, I haven’t had anybody who is my peer working with me. Spending time with Phil, it’s given me a perspective of how valuable it can be of having someone at the same level and capability set."

According to activist investor David Kingston, the merger marked the death of the listed VGI controlled by Rob Luciano when it merged with Regal.

Following VGI's merger with Regal Funds Management, VGI’s unlisted funds under management declined by as much as 55% between June 2021 to March 2022.

In June 2022, Luciano was subsequently replaced as Portfolio Manager of VG8 by King. In November 2022, VGI Partners Asian Investments changed its name to Regal Asian Investments, which reflected recent changes in investment management responsibilities.

Personal life 
Luciano’s father, a professional hotel piano player, moved to Australia with his family before Luciano was born. Luciano’s mother was a school teacher.

Luciano lives in Sydney, and owns homes in Mosman and Palm Beach.

Luciano is married to Samantha Luciano (née Cook).

In November 2022, Luciano was called out for investing A$5m of VG8 shareholders' capital in brother-in-law Jonathon Cook's micro-cap business, SenSen Networks, despite the fund’s prospectus clearly nominating a preference for large and liquid companies. At the time, Jonathon Cook was SenSen's Chief Financial Officer, and Luciano got the tip during Christmas 2020, when Luciano is said to have joined with him and others for the traditional family lunch.

Philanthropy 
In 2018, VGI established a philanthropic arm, the VGI Partners Foundation. Luciano has supported the Wanderers Education Program, which funds tertiary education for members of the Special Air Service Regiment. The VGI Partners Foundation also supported the Sydney Children’s Hospital and the Sydney Jewish Museum.

A further philanthropic activity undertaken by VGI has involved the management of funds on a pro bono basis for charities. A part of this philanthropic activity saw VGI partner with Future Generation Global (FGG) when FGG was listed on the ASX in September 2015. This relationship subsequently fractured, with FGG disclosing in August 2022 that it had redeemed the $42 million it had invested with VGI Partners. FGG has said that it tends to remove a manager if there’s consistent underperformance over a very long extended period of time, or if for instance there might be key personnel that might leave.

References 

Living people
1974 births
Australian financial businesspeople